Mycena atkinsonii is a species of agaric fungus in the family Mycenaceae. The species was first described scientifically by New York State botanist Homer Doliver House in 1920.

References

External links

atkinsonii
Fungi described in 1920
Fungi of North America